The Danish Radio Big Band (aka: DR Big Band), often referred to as the Radioens Big Band is a radio ensemble and big band founded in Copenhagen in 1964 at the Danish Broadcasting Corporation (DR).

Band history 
Originally called the New Radio Dance Orchestra, in the early years the band was led by Ib Glindemann. But over the next few decades many new faces joined, such as Chris Potter, Thad Jones, Bob Brookmeyer, Jim McNeely, and guest soloists like Miles Davis, Stan Getz, and Joe Henderson.

The band is one of the premiere large jazz ensembles in Denmark, the Danish Radio Big Band (aka DR Big Band) is a dynamic ensemble with a sophisticated approach to post-bop jazz and swing. Although a spotlight organization in their own right with a roster of top Danish musicians, they have built a strong reputation for their many collaborations and recordings with world-renowned jazz soloists. Founded as the New Radio Dance Orchestra in 1964 by bandleader Ib Glindemann, the DR Big Band was initially an outgrowth of the then-Danish Broadcasting Corporation Danmarks Radio's desire to represent jazz in the country and over the airwaves. Since 2009, the band has been based out of the Danish Broadcasting Corporation's Copenhagen complex DR Byen, or "DR City," along with several other nationally funded arts ensembles.

As a recording outfit, the DR Big Band debuted in 1970 with Brownsville Trolley, which featured the band led by saxophonist/composer Ray Pitts and trumpeter Palle Mikkelborg. However, the band's output increased throughout the decade under the leadership of famed trumpeter Thad Jones, who had relocated to Copenhagen. During this period, they delivered such well-regarded albums as 1978's By Jones, I think we've got it, and 1979's A good time was had by all. There were also numerous live performances during the band's first three decades, including dates with such luminaries as Stan Kenton, Dizzy Gillespie, Clark Terry, Jimmy Heath, Freddie Hubbard, and many more.

More albums followed in the '90s and found the band starting to showcase artists like saxophonist and guest conductor Ernie Wilkins (Suite for Jazz Band) and Danish saxophonist Jesper Thilo. They also released albums paying homage to the music of Jones and Duke Ellington. This trend of showcasing an artist and their work continued over the next decade as the band played with such luminaries as Thomas Clausen, Toots Thielemans, Renee Rosnes, Eivor Palsdottir, Jim McNeely, and others.

In 2009, they paired with longtime Wynton Marsalis drummer Jeff "Tain" Watts for Impaler, followed a year later by Chromazone with guitarist Mike Stern. Similarly, trumpeter Randy Brecker was the focus of 2011's The Jazz Ballad Song Book. Also that year, lauded saxophonist Chris Potter joined the group for Transatlantic. More albums followed, including works with Richard Bona, Vincent Nilsson, and the band's own trumpeter Gerard Presencer (Groove Travels). Vocalist Curtis Stigers collaborated with the ensemble for his 2017 Frank Sinatra salute One More for the Road. That same year, they delivered the live album Charlie Watts Meets the Danish Radio Big Band, which showcased a 2010 performance with the iconic Rolling Stones drummer.

Band 
Members

Trumpet:
 Erik Eilertsen
 Dave Vreuls
 Thomas Kjærgaard
 Mads La Cour
 Gerard Presencer

Trombone:
 Peter Dahlgren
 Vakant
 Vincent Nilsson
 Annette Saxe
 Jakob Munck Mortensen

Saxophone:
 Peter Fuglsang
 Nicolai Schultz
 Hans Ulrik 
 Karl-Martin Almqvist
 Anders Gaardmand

Rhythm group:
 Søren Frost (dr)
 Kaspar Vadsholt (b)
 Henrik Gunde (p)
 Per Gade (g)

Former members

Saxophone:
 Bent Jædig
 Jesper Thilo (1966–1989)
 Per Carsten

Trumpet:
 Benny Rosenfeld
 Palle Bolvig
 Idrees Sulieman
 Jens Winther (1982–1989)
 Thomas Fryland (1998–2005)
 Henrik Bolberg

Trombone:
 Vincent Nilsson
 Erling Kroner
 Richard B. Boone

Bass:
 Niels-Henning Ørsted Pedersen
 Bo Stief
 Mads Vinding
 Jesper Lundgaard (1989–1991)

Drums:
 Bjarne Rostvold (?–1978)
 Lennart Gruvstedt (1978–?)

Chief conductors
 Ib Glindemann (1964–1968)
 Various guest conductors, including Oliver Nelson, Frank Foster, Robert Cornford, Jimmy Heath, Clark Terry, Mary Lou Williams, Michael Gibbs and Mike Westbrook
  (1971–1973)
 Palle Mikkelborg (1976–1977 & 1981–1982)
 Thad Jones (1977–1978)
  (1986–1995)
 Bob Brookmeyer (1996–1997)
 Jim McNeely (1998–2002)
 Miho Hazama (2019– present)

Discography

As leader/co-leader
 Brownsville Trolley Line (Sonet, 1970) – recorded in 1969. conducted by Ray Pitts and Palle Mikkelborg.
 By Jones, I think we've got it (Metronome/Atlantic, 1978) – recorded live at Jazzhus Montmartre, Copenhagen. conducted by Thad Jones.
 A good time was had by all (Metronome/Storyville, 1979) – recorded live at Jazzhus Montmartre, Copenhagen in 1978. conducted by Thad Jones.
 Crackdown: First U.K. Tour (Hep, 1988) – recorded live at Glasgow and York in 1987
 Nordjazz Big 5 (Odin, 1991) – conducted by Ole Koch Hansen
 Suite for Jazz Band with guest conductor Ernie Wilkins (Hep, 1992) – recorded in 1991
 Ambiance with Niels-Henning Ørsted Pedersen (Dacapo, 1994) – recorded in 1993
 A Little Bit of Duke featuring Jesper Thilo (Dacapo, 1995) – compositions of Duke Ellington. recorded in 1994.
 Danish Radio Big Band Plays Thad Jones (Dacapo, 1996) – compositions of Thad Jones. recorded in 1994.
 This Train (Dacapo, 1997)
 Ways of Seeing (Storyville, 1999) – recorded in 1997
 Nice Work with Jim McNeely (Dacapo, 2000) – recorded in 1998
 The Power and the Glory: A salute to Louis Armstrong with Jim McNeely featuring Leroy Jones (Storyville, 2001) – compositions of Louis Armstrong
 Renee Rosnes and the Danish Radio Big Band with Renee Rosnes (Blue Note, 2003) – conducted by Jim McNeely. recorded in 2001.
 Lady Be Good with Etta Cameron (Content/DR/CMC, 2004) – conducted by Nikolaj Bentzon. recorded in 2003.
 Cuban Flavour (Cope, 2004)
 Trøllabundin with Eivør Pálsdóttir (Cope, 2005) – conducted by Jesper Riis. recorded in 2004–05.
 Dansk Stereo (Cope, 2005)
 Dedication Suite with Jim McNeely (Cape, 2006) – recorded in 2002
 The James Bond Classics featuring Szhirley (EMI/Red Dot, 2008)
 Jazz Divas of Scandinavia with Caecilie Norby, Silje Nergaard, Rigmor Gustafsson (Red Dot, 2009)
 Cirkus Summarum (EMI/Red Dot, 2009)
 Merry Christmas, Baby with Sinne Eeg, Bobo Moreno (EMI/Red Dot, 2009)
 Impressions of a West Side Story (EMI/Red Dot, 2009)
 The Music of Jacob Gade (EMI/Red Dot, 2009) – compositions of Jacob Gade
 The Impaler featuring Jeff "Tain" Watts (Red Dot, 2010) – recorded in 2009
 The Phoenix with Vince Mendoza (Red Dot, 2010)
 Cirkus Summarum 2010 (EMI/Red Dot, 2010)
 Chromazone featuring Mike Stern (Red Dot, 2010)
 Play Bill Evans with Jim McNeely (Stunt, 2012) – compositions of Bill Evans. recorded in 2000.
 The Danish Radio Jazz Group With Bent Jædig – 1964 - 1966 (Jazzhus Disk, 2012)
 Spirituals (Storyville, 2014) – conducted by Vincent Nilsson
 Jazzin' Around Christmas (Storyville, 2016) – conducted by Dennis Mackrel
 At the Heart of a Selkie with Eivør, Peter Jensen (Tutl, 2016) – also with the Danish National Vocal Ensemble
 Gerard Presencer featuring DR Big Band, Groove Travels (Edition, 2016) – recorded in 2015
 Charlie Watts Meets The Danish Radio Big Band with Charlie Watts (Impulse!, 2017) – recorded in 2010
 The Beast with Mathias Heise (Giant Sheep Music, 2018)
 Light Through Leaves with Peter Jensen, Morten Büchert (ILK Music, 2021)
 Miho Hazama featuring DR Big Band, Imaginary Visions (Edition, 2021)

As guest
 Sigurd Barrett, Live (My Way Music, 2007) – conducted by Nikolaj Bentzon
 Randy Brecker, The Jazz Ballad Song Book (Red Dot, 2011) – also with the Danish National Chamber Orchestra
 Marie Bergman, But Beautiful (Stunt, 1994) – conducted by Ole Kock Hansen
 Richard Bona, Te Mesia (Red Dot, 2011) – conducted by Jesper Riis
 Sinne Eeg, We've Just Begun (Stunt, 2020)
 Eliane Elias, Impulsive! (Stunt, 1997) – conducted by Bob Brookmeyer
 Georgie Fame, Endangered Species (Music Mecca, 1993)
 Ib Glindemann, Talk of the Town (Olufsen, 1992) – recorded in 1988
 Siobhan Lamb, The Nightingale and the Rose (Proprius, 2012) – also with Danish National Vocal Ensemble
 Marius Neset, Tributes (ACT Music, 2020)
 Judy Niemack & Jim McNeely, New York Stories (Sunnyside, 2018) – recorded in 2013
 Chris Potter, Transatlantic (Red Dot, 2011) – recorded in 2010
 Curtis Stigers, One More for the Road (Concord Jazz, 2017) – recorded in 2014
 Bengt-Arne Wallin, The Unexpected Symphony (Sonet, 1979) – recorded in 1977

See also
 Danish jazz

References

External links

  
.

Radio and television orchestras
Big bands
Danish jazz ensembles
Musical groups established in 1964
Radio and television house bands
Edition Records artists
Hep Records artists
Storyville Records artists